Central Solomons may refer to:

Central Province (Solomon Islands), a province of the Solomon Islands
Central Solomons constituency, a constituency in the Legislative Council of the Solomon Islands
Central Solomon languages, a group of languages spoken in the Solomon Islands